Manchester City is represented at Reserve level for football by the Elite Development Squad, also referred to as just the Elite Squad, or EDS, a predominantly Under-23 side that replaced the previous (more senior) Reserve team in a move to focus on youth development post-academy. The club is represented at the Under-18 level by the Manchester City Academy team.

City currently hold a treble of 2021–22 Premier League titles at Senior, U-23 and U-18 level. All three titles were successfully retained for the second consecutive season.

Elite Development Squad

The Elite Development Squad from season 2012–13 player in the Under 21 Premier League and
previously played in the Premier Reserve League North. Starting with the 2011–12 season, the EDS competed in the NextGen Series competition,
a Champions League format tournament only open to a select group of 'Under-19' teams located in western Europe.
The NextGen Series organisers invited the 16 teams competing in the inaugural season of this new competition based on which clubs were considered to have the best academies in Europe.
At the time, the EDS continued to play fixtures in both the Manchester Senior Cup and Lancashire Senior Cup plus several other matches and tournaments such as the Central League Cup.

In 2016-17 the U-21 Premier League was renamed as Premier League 2 and the age limit was raised to U-23. City won their first title at this level in the 2020–21 season and retained their title in 2021–22.

The UEFA Youth League launched in 2013–14, replacing the NextGen series, as a U-19 competition for the youth teams of Champions League participants and national champions at U-18 level. Teams fielded by City in this competition were therefore a hybrid of their EDS and academy squads. Their best performance to date has been a semi-final appearance in 2017–18.

Manchester City has fielded a reserve team since 1892 when the reserves played in the Lancashire Combination. The reserves were champions of the Lancashire Combination in 1901–02.
The club left the Lancashire Combination in 1911 to join the Central League upon its formation. The City reserve team then played in the Central League until 2000, winning it on three occasions in the 1977–78, 1986–87 and 1999–2000 seasons. In 2006 the club re-entered the Central League – now the Pontin's League (West) – but this time in order to provide games for the 'Under-17' age group of players.

In recent seasons, Manchester City has purchased, registered and loaned young international players as part of their development strategy for the City Football Group. Although these players are officially Manchester City players, they have never made competitive appearances for City's senior or youth teams and may in future be transferred out before doing so. In 2022, FIFA have implemented new rules which will now restrict loans of this nature.

Home ground
The EDS play all of their home fixtures at the Academy Stadium.

Squad numbers
The squad numbers depicted for the EDS players in this article are the MCFC first team squad numbers – which means that these are the shirt numbers that the EDS players will wear if and when team-sheeted to play for the MCFC first team in either a friendly or competitive game. The current MCFC official first team squad consists of only about 20 players, however, the EDS players' squad numbers traditionally start in the region of the middle forties.  For the Premier League 2, players use the 1–11 numbering system whilst squad numbers (including player names) are used for the EFL Trophy.

The MCFC first team squad numbers are normally assigned and published in late July during the close season and they remain constant for the entire duration of the upcoming season (meaning that a squad number that is assigned to a player in the close season who subsequently wears that number in a competitive match, but who later leaves the club during that same season, will not be assigned to another player during the remainder of that season).

Current squad

EDS players out on loan
These are EDS players who have previously made competitive appearances for the Manchester City Academy, EDS or First Team, or have been brought with the explicit intention to join the first team in future.

City Football Group players out on loan
These are Manchester City players who are usually on loan as part of the CFG development strategy, are yet to make a competitive appearance for the club's Academy, EDS or First Team, or are over the age of 23.

Reserve/EDS Manager history

Academy

Manchester City's Academy is responsible for youth development at the club, with the goal of developing young players for the future. The academy is one of the most revered in the country and since its new incarnation in 1998, it has produced more professional players than any other Premier League club.

History
The club's first youth team was set up by Albert Alexander in the 1920s, known as the 'A' Team. From 1951 the 'A' team competed in the Lancashire League against reserve and youth teams of other clubs from North West England. From 1955 a second youth team, the 'B' team, typically comprising younger players than the 'A' team, competed in Division Two of the Lancashire League.

Youth football in England was restructured by the Football Association in 1997, with the introduction of the Academy system. Current International Youth Academy Director Jim Cassell joined from Oldham Athletic in July 1997 and was responsible for building Manchester City's youth structure, which gained Academy accreditation in 1998.

In its new incarnation, the 'A' and 'B' teams were replaced with 'Under-19' and 'Under-17' teams, which competed in the FA Premier Youth League. Since gaining FA approval in 1998 the academy has produced 78 players for Manchester City's first team, 28 of whom have gained full international honours, including England internationals Shaun Wright-Phillips, Micah Richards, Joey Barton, Daniel Sturridge and Phil Foden. The academy not only produces players for Manchester City but also players that have the talent to make the grade elsewhere, with players such as Ben Mee who's had a successful career at Burnley and Brentford, Jadon Sancho at Borussia Dortmund and Manchester United, Kelechi Iheanacho at Leicester and Kieran Trippier formerly at Burnley, Spurs, Atlético Madrid and now at Newcastle United.

Present day
Since the club was taken over in September 2008, with extra capital and increased ambitions the club looked to expand their successful academy further afield and City in the Community programme in Manchester. In 2010, the Platt Lane complex was upgraded to include new facilities, such as a gym, changing rooms, as well as office and seminar space The club also launched an instructional video website aimed at helping the new skills of prospective footballers

City announced on 19 September 2011 that they would build an 80-acre training facility, known since as the City Football Academy to cater for around 400 youth players at a time, the campus was opened on 8 December 2014, and has since become the base for all senior and youth Manchester City men's and women's teams.

Squad numbers
The squad numbers (if any) depicted for the academy players in this article are MCFC first-team squad numbers – which means that these are the shirt numbers that the academy players will wear if and when they are selected to play for the MCFC first team in either a friendly or competitive game.

Current squad

Academy Manager history

Academy graduates (1998–present)
These are the academy players who have made at least one competitive appearance for the Manchester City first team.
Academy graduates who still play for Manchester City, including those that are currently out on loan to other clubs, are highlighted in blue.
Updated 1 September 2022

Retired from playing or unattached players

Active players

Honours

Elite Development Squad
Premier League 2
Winners (2): 2020–21, 2021–22
Premier League International Cup
Winners (1): 2014–15
The Central League
Winners (4): 1977–78, 1986–87, 1999–00, 2007–08
Lancashire Senior Cup
Winners (6): 1920–21, 1922–23, 1927–28, 1929–30, 1952–53, 1973–74

Academy
FA Youth Cup
Winners (3): 1986, 2008, 2020
U-18 Professional Development League
Northern Division Champions (9)  1997–98, 2007–08, 2009–10, 2013–14, 2015–16, 2016–17, 2019–20, 2020–21, 2021–22
National Champions: (4)  2015–16, 2019–20, 2020–21, 2021–22
U-18 Premier League Cup
Winners (2): 2018–19, 2019–20

Notes

References

External links
Manchester City official website – Academy
Manchester City Official website – Cityecademy
 The Manchester City academy way – These Football Times (2016)

Reserves
Football academies in England
Lancashire Combination
Lancashire League (football)
Premier League International Cup
UEFA Youth League teams
NextGen series